is a Japanese commercial television broadcasting company operated as a part of Warner Bros. Discovery through its International division.

History 
Discovery). On September 1, 1997, the company launched the Japanese version of Cartoon Network on PerfecTV (a forerunner to what is now Sky PerfecTV Premium Service). The company officially renamed itself as Turner Japan K.K. on April 1, 2013.

On January 1, 2014, JIC was merged into Turner Japan.

On January 30, 2018, Turner Japan launched three new channels, Boomerang (a spin off channel to Cartoon Network), Tabi Tele (a spin off to Tabi Channel) and Mondo Mah-jong TV (a spin off to Mondo TV), on NTT Docomo's DTV Channel OTT multichannel television platform.

On March 31, 2022, with the end of the dTV channel service, program distribution on the service ended on the same date.

TV channels 
 Cartoon Network

Former / Defunct TV channels 
 Boomerang
 Mondo Mah-jong TV
 Tabi Tele

References

External links 
 Cartoon Network
 Mondo TV
 Tabi Channel

Warner Bros. Discovery Asia-Pacific
Japanese subsidiaries of foreign companies
Mass media companies established in 1997
Japanese companies established in 1997
Itochu